Abudwak Airport, is an airport serving Abudwak and nearby residents including across border, a highly populated 
town in the central Galguduud region of Somalia. It is also known as Caabudwaaq Airport.

Overview
The airport was formerly just a dirt airstrip near the town of Abudwak. 

A major renovation project was later launched in 2011, funded by Somali expatriates from the province. In June 2012, the Somali-American Women's Foundation (SAWF) also contributed $70,000 toward the facelift, after the airport's rehabilitation committee had approached it.

The airstrip was gravelized by July 2012, and a new building was built by January 2013. 

According to a government official, all of the facility's sections have since been renovated and are available for use. However, the immigration wing is still being built as of October 2012.

The new airport began scheduled flights on 11 October 2012.

The airport serves an average of 2 flights per day, and 800 passengers per month. In February 2021, more gravel was added to the runway and graded, as preparation for it to be paved with asphalt concrete.

See also
 List of airports in Somalia

References

Airports in Somalia
Galguduud